Kleptuza Glacier is a 6 km long and 6 km wide glacier draining the east slopes of Mount Hector in the Trojan Range and the north slopes of Osterrieth Range on Anvers Island in the Palmer Archipelago, Antarctica. Situated southeast of Thamyris Glacier and west of Altimir Glacier.  Flowing northwards to enter Fournier Bay east of Madzharovo Point and west of Studena Point.

The glacier is named after the karst spring of Kleptuza in southern Bulgaria.

Location
British mapping in 1980.

See also
 List of glaciers in the Antarctic
 Glaciology

Maps
 British Antarctic Territory. Scale 1:200000 topographic map No. 3217. DOS 610 - W 64 62. Tolworth, UK, 1980.
 Antarctic Digital Database (ADD). Scale 1:250000 topographic map of Antarctica. Scientific Committee on Antarctic Research (SCAR). Since 1993, regularly upgraded and updated.

References
 Kleptuza Glacier. SCAR Composite Gazetteer of Antarctica
 Bulgarian Antarctic Gazetteer. Antarctic Place-names Commission. (details in Bulgarian, basic data in English)

External links
 Kleptuza Glacier. Copernix satellite image

Glaciers of the Palmer Archipelago
Bulgaria and the Antarctic
Geography of Anvers Island